The Sullivan Family of Companies is a privately run  American supermarket, retailer and restaurant franchiser headquartered in Honolulu, Hawaii. The family-owned business is run by Jenai S. Wall, the daughter of Maurice J. "Sully" Sullivan, who founded the Foodland supermarket chain, which she expanded after his death. Although all of the properties are under the same roof, each is run separately.

Supermarkets

Foodland (34 stores in Hawaii)
Sack 'n Save (2 on Oahu, 1 on Maui, 3 stores on Big Island)
Malama Market (5 stores in Hawaii)
Food Pantry (2 stores in Hawaii)

Liquors
R. Field Wine Co. (5 locations on Oahu, 2 on Maui, 1 on Big Island)

Convenience stores
EZ Discount Store (6 stores in Hawaii)
Whalers General Store (13 stores in Hawaii)
Coco Cove (2 stores in Hawaii)
Lahaina Discount (one store in Hawaii)

Retail shops
Lamont's Gift Shops and Sundries (39 locations in Hawaii, California, Illinois, North Carolina, Missouri, New York, Nevada, Florida, Massachusetts, and Arizona)
Accents (8 stores in Hawaii, California and Florida)
Resort Sundries (3 stores in Hawaii and California)
Surf City Trading Co. (one location in California)

Clothing
Kohala Bay Collection (3 locations in Hawaii)
Oasis Lifestyle Store (2 locations in Hawaii)
Ocean Commotion (one location in Hawaii)
Water Wear Hawaii (one location in Hawaii)

Restaurants
HI Steaks (three locations on Oahu)

Et al) 

Mahi'ai Table) 

Redfish Poke) 

ELEVEN) 

Piko Kitchen + Bar) 

Kilauea Market + Cafe) 

Pau Hana Bar)

Franchises
The Coffee Bean & Tea Leaf (19 locations in Hawaii)
Beard Papa's (1 location in Hawaii in the Ala Moana Shopping Center)

References

External links
 

Supermarkets of the United States
Retail companies of the United States
Fast-food chains of the United States
Convenience stores of the United States
Regional restaurant chains in the United States
Companies based in Honolulu
Retail companies based in Hawaii
Family-owned companies of the United States